Luis Fernando Navarro Jiménez (born 4 November 1960) is a Colombian general. He serves as General Commander of the Military Forces of Colombia . He was appointed by President Iván Duque Márquez on 10 December 2018.

References 

Living people
1960 births
Place of birth missing (living people)
Colombian generals
20th-century Colombian people